Pond Creek Mills is an unincorporated community in Knox County, Indiana, in the United States.

History
A post office was established at Pond Creek Mills in 1851. The community took its name from Pond Creek.

References

Unincorporated communities in Knox County, Indiana
Unincorporated communities in Indiana